is a Japanese football player for Aventura Kawaguchi.

Playing career
Ota was born in Kanagawa Prefecture on May 2, 1994. After graduating from Ritsumeikan University, he joined J2 League club FC Machida Zelvia in 2017. On June 6, 2018, he debuted against Fagiano Okayama in Emperor's Cup.

References

External links

1994 births
Living people
Ritsumeikan University alumni
Association football people from Kanagawa Prefecture
Japanese footballers
FC Machida Zelvia players
Tochigi City FC players
Association football defenders